Dewey Phillip Bryant (born December 9, 1954) is an American politician who served as the 64th governor of Mississippi from 2012 to 2020. A member of the Republican Party, he was the 31st lieutenant governor of Mississippi from 2008 to 2012 and 40th state auditor of Mississippi from 1996 to 2008. A Republican, Bryant was elected governor in 2011, defeating the Democratic nominee Mayor Johnny DuPree of Hattiesburg. He was reelected in 2015, defeating Democratic nominee Robert Gray.

Early life and education
Bryant was born in Moorhead in Sunflower County in the Mississippi Delta. He is the son of Dewey C., a diesel mechanic, and Estelle R. Bryant, a mother who stayed home with her three boys. Bryant's family moved to the capital of Jackson, where his father worked for Jackson Mack Sales and was later Service Manager there.

Dewey Phillip Bryant attended Council McCluer High School his junior and senior years.

Bryant studied first at Hinds Community College and received a bachelor's degree in criminal justice from the University of Southern Mississippi and a master's degree in political science from Mississippi College in Clinton. He also received an Honorary Doctorate of Laws degree from Mississippi College, where he served as an adjunct professor teaching Mississippi political history, both before and during his first term as governor.

Political career

Prior to entering government public service, Bryant was a deputy sheriff in Hinds County from 1976 to 1981; he worked undercover in drug law enforcement and also worked as an insurance claims investigator. After his election to the Mississippi House of Representatives, Bryant served as Vice Chairman of the House Insurance Committee. Notably, he sponsored the Capital Gains Tax Cut Act of 1992.

Bryant was appointed to serve as State Auditor by Governor Kirk Fordice following the resignation of Steve Patterson. He was sworn-in on November 1, 1996. Bryant was subsequently elected to a full term as auditor in 1999 and reelected in 2003. That year he convinced the Mississippi State Legislature to grant law enforcement officers in the auditor's office's investigative division full powers of arrest.

In 2007, he was elected Lieutenant Governor of Mississippi, defeating the Democratic Party candidate, State Representative Jamie Franks.

In 2011, Bryant was elected Governor of Mississippi, defeating the Democratic nominee Johnny DuPree.

After leaving public office in 2019, Bryant became a founding member of BSS Global, a consulting firm.

Governor of Mississippi

2011 election

Bryant won the Republican primary in the gubernatorial election in 2011. He defeated Democratic nominee Johnny DuPree on November 8, with 60.98 percent of the vote compared to DuPree's 39.2 percent.

First term

On January 10, 2012, Bryant was sworn in as the 64th Governor of Mississippi. Former Republican State Chairman Jim Herring, a lawyer from Canton, headed the transition team. Once inaugurated, Bryant signed into law a bill requiring doctors at abortion clinics to have admitting privileges at local hospitals in an attempt to "end abortion in Mississippi". At the time, the state had a single abortion clinic, served only by out-of-state doctors who lacked in-state admitting privileges.

2015 re-election

Governor Bryant ran for re-election in 2015, facing off against Mitch Young in the Republican primary, carrying 91.7 percent of the vote. On November 5, Bryant faced the Democratic nominee, truck driver Robert Gray, winning with 66.6 percent of the vote. Because Mississippi is one of the eight U.S. states that have a two-term lifetime limit, he was ineligible to seek a third term in the 2019 gubernatorial election.

Second term

In 2015, Phil Bryant refused to support legislation to change the flag of Mississippi to remove the Confederate battle saltire, even though some members of his party, such as House Speaker Philip Gunn, publicly said the flag needed to change so that it could represent all Mississippians.  Bryant took the position that voters should make the decision on the state flag.

On April 5, 2016, Bryant signed House Bill 1523, the HB-1523, which allows government employees and private businesses to cite religious beliefs to deny services to same-sex couples seeking a marriage license. The governor said on Twitter that HB-1523, "merely reinforces the rights which currently exist to the exercise of religious freedom as stated in the First Amendment to the U.S. Constitution."

Bryant announced on February 21, 2017, that he would make emergency budget cuts to most state agency budgets for the third time in the current fiscal year, having made similar cuts in the previous year because of the lack of projected revenue.

Bryant signed a law scheduled to go into effect on July 1, 2019, that would ban abortions later than six weeks of pregnancy.  The Center for Reproductive Rights in Jackson challenged the law. Because of his decision finding the prior less restrictive "15-week" law in the Currier case to be unconstitutional, Southern District of Mississippi Judge Carlton Reeves began his decision by referencing a prior law Bryant had signed and which Reeves had struck down in 2018. Judge Reeves wrote, "Here we go again. Mississippi has passed another law banning abortions prior to viability." He inquired, "Doesn't it boil down to six is less than fifteen?", adding that the new law "smacks of defiance to this court." Reeves noted that although there were exceptions for situations where the mother's life or health is endangered should pregnancy be taken to term, the law does not allow for exceptions in the cases of pregnancies resulting from rape or incest.

In January 2019, Bryant said he supported a bill to expand the use of civil forfeiture (the practice of seizing the property of individuals suspected of crimes even if they are not indicted or found guilty in court) so that assets valued up to $20,000 could be seized by law enforcement without the forfeiture going before a judge. Under the bill, if the owner of the assets does not contest the forfeiture, the owner loses all right to it, and could not contest it before a judge. Nick Sibilla of the Institute for Justice notes that almost half of all asset seizures are valued at under $1,000, yet the filing fees associated with contesting a forfeiture can cost upwards of $1,500, and that fees associated with hiring an attorney add to the financial burden of the owner.

Investigative reporting during Bryant's second term that looked into Mississippi statewide public officials' misuse of political campaign funds showed that Bryant had not made payments to himself or utilized campaign credit cards for unrelated personal spending, and since 2012 had spent $2.6 million on his campaign with almost as much left over. The campaign fund was closed out with the majority of funds going to a political action committee, Imagine Mississippi PAC.

Electoral history

References

Works cited

External links
 Governor Phil Bryant official government website
 
 

|-

|-

|-

|-

|-

21st-century American politicians
Mississippi College School of Law faculty
American United Methodists
Republican Party governors of Mississippi
Hinds Community College alumni
Lieutenant Governors of Mississippi
Living people
Republican Party members of the Mississippi House of Representatives
Mississippi College alumni
People from Moorhead, Mississippi
State Auditors of Mississippi
University of Southern Mississippi alumni
1954 births